Kurt Burris (June 27, 1932 – July 21, 1999) was an American gridiron football center. He played college football at Oklahoma, where he was an All-American and finished second in the 1954 Heisman Trophy balloting. In 2000, he was inducted into the College Football Hall of Fame.

Burris was selected in the 1955 NFL Draft by the Cleveland Browns, but he went to the Canadian Football League, where he played for five seasons.

Burris had five brothers who also played football at Oklahoma, including three time All-American Paul "Buddy" Burris. Burris died on July 21, 1999 in Billings, Montana. He was 67.

References

1932 births
1999 deaths
All-American college football players
American football centers
Calgary Stampeders players
College Football Hall of Fame inductees
Edmonton Elks players
Oklahoma Sooners football players
People from Nowata, Oklahoma
Players of American football from Oklahoma
Saskatchewan Roughriders players